Wylde Mammoths were founded in Stockholm, Sweden in the mid-1980s and were part of the thriving garage rock scene of the day which included The Stomachmouths, High Speed V, Crimson Shadows and The Creeps. In 1986 they were signed to the American label Crypt Records, being one of the first new bands Crypt released, before that they mostly made 1960s garage compilations like the Back from the grave-series. 
Being very influenced by the music of the 1960s themselves, The Wylde Mammoths recorded their first album in singer Peter Maniette's basement only using an old 2-track Beocord tape recorder. Tours of the US and Europe and more records followed before the band split up in the early 1990s.

Band members
Peter Maniette - vocals, guitar
Per Wannerberg - guitar
Patrick Emt - bass
Stellan Wahlström - drums

Discography

Albums
Go Baby Go!! (Crypt Records) 1987
Things That Matter (Crypt Records) 1988

Singles and EP's
Four Wolly Giants EP (Mystery Scene Records) 1986
Help That Girl EP (Crypt Records) 1987
I Can't Go Without You/Deep Down In Misery (Splendid magazine 3 flexi) 1988
Before I's Too Late/I Can't Win (Unique Records) 1990 
You Gotta Go EP (Misty Lane Records) 1994

Compilations
60-tals Popjubileum - Live at Tyrol (New Music Records) 1989
Roots of Swedish pop - The garage days vol 2 (Uppers Records) 1996

External links
 Wylde Mammoths on Myspace
 Discogs

Swedish rock music groups